Gavazzi is an Italian surname. Notable people with the surname include:

Alessandro Gavazzi (1809–1889), Italian preacher
Artur Gavazzi (1861–1944), Croatian geographer
Carla Gavazzi (1913–2008), Italian operatic soprano
Davide Gavazzi (born 1986), Italian footballer who plays as a midfielder
Francesco Gavazzi (born 1984), Italian cyclist
Giovanni di Giacomo Gavazzi, also called Giacomo Gavasio (16th-century), Italian painter of the Renaissance style
Mattia Gavazzi (born 1983), Italian cyclist
Michèle Gavazzi (born 1973), Uruguayan-Canadian writer
Milovan Gavazzi (1895-1992), Croatian ethnographer
Modesto Gavazzi, O.F.M. Conv. (died 1608), Italian Roman Catholic Bishop of Alife 
Pierino Gavazzi (born 1950), Italian cyclist

See also 
 Gava (disambiguation)
 Palazzo Gavazzi, a Neoclassical palace in Del Monte district, Milan, Italy

Italian-language surnames
it:Gavazzi (disambigua)